WIBA-FM (101.5 MHz) is a radio station licensed to Sauk City, Wisconsin and serving Madison and south central Wisconsin.  The station is owned and operated by iHeartMedia (formerly Clear Channel Communications) and broadcasts a classic rock music format on its primary HD radio, while its HD2 channel carries an oldies format that is simulcast to analog translator station W265CV (100.9 FM).

Station History
Originally licensed to the city of Madison, Wisconsin (the station's city of license would be moved to Sauk City in the 2010s), WIBA-FM commenced broadcasting on October 31, 1969, simulcasting the signal of its AM sister station WIBA (1310 kHz) during the daytime, and at night switching over to a free-form mix of primarily rock, folk, and blues. The  nickname “Radio Free Madison” or “RFM” was coined to distinguish the evening programming from the daytime AM feed.  During the 1970s, WIBA-FM transitioned to a full time freeform format, dropping the AM simulcast, and featuring local artists through such programs as Television, WIBA-FM's simulcast of the WMTV late-night weekend music program. In 1981 WIBA-FM overnight switched to its classic rock format.

WIBA-FM's current programming includes the Premiere Networks-syndicated Bob & Tom Show, heard weekdays 6AM-10AM, and Sixx Sense with Nikki Sixx in the 7PM-12AM weeknight slot.  WIBA-FM also serves as Madison's FM home of Green Bay Packers football and Wisconsin Badgers football and men's basketball, in a simulcast with WIBA (AM).

HD Radio
WIBA-FM transmits a multiplexed HD Radio signal.  The station's HD2 sidechannel launched in the mid-2000s and originally aired an all-comedy format, until converting to a commercial-free alternative rock format in 2007, chiefly employing announcers and alt-rock playlists from Clear Channel's national format lab but employing the former "Mad Radio" branding that previously used on two other Clear Channel Madison stations (at 92.1 FM and 96.3 FM).

In Fall 2013, "Mad Radio" would be replaced by a simulcast of "Socially Sound Radio," an iHeartRadio Top 40/pop channel that emphasizes songs and artists that generate interest among social media platforms.  After iHeartRadio dropped Socially Sound in Summer 2014, 101.5-HD2 would feature a rotation of various iHeartRadio channels, among them "Roots of Rock" (1960s/1970s progressive/album rock), "My 80s" (80s pop songs), and "re-Covered Radio" (modern cover versions of iconic songs).

In November 2016, WIBA-FM-HD2 would convert to a simulcast of all-sports sister station WTSO (1070 AM), which already had a presence on FM since 2014 at 100.9 MHz (W265CV).  The move ensured W265CV's official status as a relay of WIBA-FM, as indicated in the FCC database.  The WTSO simulcast would end on February 1, 2020, when W265CV and WIBA-FM-HD2 would convert to an oldies format branded as "U100.9".

WIBA-FM briefly had an HD3 subchannel in 2012, simulcasting the news/talk format of WIBA (1310 kHz).

Translators
The following analog FM translator rebroadcasts the HD2 subchannel of WIBA-FM.

References

External links
WIBA-FM website

IBA-FM
Classic rock radio stations in the United States
IHeartMedia radio stations